Cyperus hypochlorus, commonly known as the Oahu flatsedge, is a species of sedge that is native to parts of Hawaii.

See also
List of Cyperus species

References

hypochlorus
Plants described in 1888
Flora of Hawaii
Taxa named by William Hillebrand